James Colin Campbell (11 October 1859 – 26 August 1928) was a Scottish-born film director, actor and screenwriter. He directed more than 170 films between 1911 and 1924. He also wrote for 60 films between 1911 and 1922. He was born in Scotland, and died in Hollywood, California.

Campbell married actress Blanche Crozier on March 2, 1912.

Selected filmography

 Brown of Harvard (1911)
 An Assisted Elopement (1912)
 The Count of Monte Cristo (1912)
 Alas! Poor Yorick! (1913)
 A Wise Old Elephant (1913)
 Wamba A Child of the Jungle (1913)
 The Spoilers (1914)
 Shotgun Jones (1914)
 Chip of the Flying U (1914)
 The Rosary (1915)
 The Carpet from Bagdad (1915)
 Sweet Alyssum (1915)
 Tillie's Tomato Surprise (1915)
 Thou Shalt Not Covet (1916)
 The Garden of Allah (1916)
 Gloria's Romance (1916)
 The Crisis (1916)
 Beware of Strangers (1917)
 Who Shall Take My Life? (1917)
 The Sea Flower (1918)
 The City of Purple Dreams (1918)
 The Yellow Dog (1918)
 The Still Alarm (1918)
 The Beauty Market (1919)
 The Railroader (1919)
 The Thunderbolt (1919)
 Moon Madness (1920)
 When Dawn Came (1920)
 The Corsican Brothers (1920)
 The First Born (1921)
 Where Lights Are Low (1921)
 The Lure of Jade (1921)
 The Swamp (1921)
 A Man of Stone (1921)
 "Black Roses" (1921)
 The World's a Stage (1922)
 The Buster (1923)
 Three Who Paid (1923)
 The Bowery Bishop (1924)
 The White Monkey (1925)

References

External links
 
 

1859 births
1928 deaths
American film directors
American male screenwriters
Scottish emigrants to the United States
Silent film directors
20th-century American male writers
20th-century American screenwriters